BNS Umar Farooq is a Type 053H3 frigate of the Bangladesh Navy. She has served in the Bangladesh Navy since 2020. The ship is named after the second Rashidun Caliph Omar.

History
The Type 053H3 frigate BNS Umar Farooq was previously known as Lianyungang (522) which served with the People's Liberation Army Navy (PLAN) in the East Sea Fleet. The ship was launched in October 1997 and commissioned to the PLAN in January 1998. On 5 August 2019, she was decommissioned to be sold to the Bangladesh Navy. The handover took place on 18 December 2019. The ship started the journey to her new home, Bangladesh, on 23 December 2019, reaching the Port of Mongla on 9 January 2020. The Bangladesh Navy commissioned her at Chittagong on 5 November 2020.

BNS Umar Farooq participated in Exercise Milan-2022, a multilateral exercise hosted by Indian Navy, held on 25 February to 4 March 2022 at Visakhapatnam. She left home to take part in the exercise on 22 February 2022. The ship returned to Chattogram on 6 March 2022.

Armament
The ship is armed with two quad-pack C-802A anti-ship missile launchers. She also carries one PJ33A dual 100 mm gun to engage surface targets. For anti-aircraft role, the ship carries an eight cell FM-90 surface-to-air missile launcher system. Besides, four Type 76A dual 37 mm AA guns are also there. For anti-submarine operations, the ship has two 6-tube Type 3200 ASW rocket launchers and two depth charge (DC) racks and four DC projectors. Type 946/PJ-46 15-barrel decoy rocket launchers are also in the ship for anti-ship missile defence.

See also
 List of active ships of the Bangladesh Navy

References

1997 ships
Frigates of the Bangladesh Navy
Ships built in China
Ships of the Bangladesh Navy
Type 053H3 frigates of the Bangladesh Navy